Charles W. Laird was the co-head football coach for the Middlebury College Panthers football team in 1944 with P. J. Dranginis. Together they compiled a record of 2–1.

Head coaching record

References

Year of birth missing
Year of death missing
Middlebury Panthers football coaches